Tritaxys is a genus of flies in the family Tachinidae.

Species
T. australis Macquart, 1847
T. braueri (de Meijere, 1924)
T. milias Walker, 1849

References

Exoristinae
Diptera of Asia
Diptera of Australasia
Tachinidae genera
Taxa named by Pierre-Justin-Marie Macquart